Mauricio Santa María Salamanca (born 19 August 1966) is a Colombian economist and politician, who previously served as Director of the National Planning Department of Colombia. He served as the 3rd Minister of Social Protection during the Administration of President Juan Manuel Santos Calderón from 2010 until its restructuring amidst a wider Ministerial Reform when the Ministry was divided into separate Health and Labour ministries, being reappointed then as the 1st Minister of Health and Social Protection of Colombia until 2012 when he was reassigned. An economist from Georgetown University, Santa María has worked as a Consultant and Senior Economist for the World Bank, was Deputy Director of the National Planning Department, and prior to his appointment served as Adjunct Director of the Colombian Foundation of Higher Education and Development (Fedesarrollo).

References

1966 births
People from Bogotá
Living people
Colombian economists
Georgetown University alumni
Colombian Ministers of Social Protection
Ministers of Health and Social Protection of Colombia
Directors of the National Planning Department of Colombia